Shuya River may refer to:

Shuya River, Kostroma Oblast, Russia
Shuya River, Karelia, Russia